The Interstate Highways in Georgia comprise seven current primary Interstate Highways and eight auxiliary Interstates. In addition, two primary Interstates are currently under proposal, and three auxiliary Interstates were once proposed and then cancelled. Each Interstate has a hidden state route number; for example, Interstate 75 (I-75) is also State Route 401 (SR 401) and Interstate 16 (I-16) is also State Route 404 (SR 404, the Jim Gillis Historic Savannah Parkway). This highway system uses the Georgia Peach Pass for toll lanes.


Primary Interstate Highways

Auxiliary Interstate Highways

Business routes

See also

References

External links

 Georgia Roads - The Unofficial Georgia State Highways Web Site
 The Unofficial Georgia Highways Web Page
 Georgia State Highway Ends

 
Interstate